This list presents Italian philosophers, very broadly defined, classified chronologically by historical era.

Italics philosophers

 Ocellus Lucanus
 Parmenides
 Zeno of Elea
 Corax of Syracuse
 Tisias
 Onatas
 Hippo
 Hippasus
 Epicharmus of Kos
 Eurytus
 Acrion
 Aesara
 Arignote
 Myia
 Theano
 Aeschines of Neapolis
 Calliphon of Croton
 Hicetas
 Ecphantus the Pythagorean
 Cleinias of Tarentum
 Clinomachus
 Aresas
 Brontinus
 Alcmaeon of Croton
 Damo
 Empedocles
 Gorgias
 Lycophron
 Polus
 Timaeus of Locri
 Aristoxenus
 Dicaearchus
 Archimedes
 Archytas
 Philolaus
 Lysis of Taras
 Diodotus the Stoic
 Siro the Epicurean
 Aristocles of Messene

Romans philosophers

 Rabirius
 Catius
 Amafinius
 Gaius Blossius
 Papirius Fabianus
 Aulus Cornelius Celsus
 Diodotus the Stoic
 Cato the Younger
 Cicero
 Helvidius Priscus
 Lucretius
 Marcus Junius Brutus
 Nigidius Figulus
 Seneca the Younger
 Arulenus Rusticus
 Publius Clodius Thrasea Paetus
 Gaius Musonius Rufus
 Tacitus
 Justin Martyr
 Apuleius 
 Marcus Aurelius
 Tertullian
 Marcus Minucius Felix
 Claudius Aelianus
 Amelius
 Julian
 Gaius Marius Victorinus
 Calcidius
 Tyrannius Rufinus

Medieval philosophers

 Boethius
 Cassiodorus
 James of Venice
 Joachim of Fiore
 Anselm of Besate
 Lanfranc
 Pierre Lombard
 Ibn Zafar al-Siqilli
 Peter of Capua the Elder
 Boncompagno da Signa
 Brunetto Latini 
 Bonaventure
 Thomas Aquinas
 Matthew of Aquasparta
 Giles of Rome
 Pietro d'Abano
 Cavalcante Cavalcanti
 John of Naples 
 James of Viterbo
 Michael of Cesena
 Marsilio da Padova
 Albertano da Brescia
 Menahem Recanati
 Isaac ben Mordecai
 Hillel ben Samuel
 Eliezer ben Samuel of Verona
 Francis of Marchia
 Gregory of Rimini
 Giovanni Dondi
 Blasius of Parma
 Guarino of Verona
 Paul of Venice
 Leonardo Bruni
 Palla di Onorio Strozzi
 Poggio Bracciolini
 Gaetano da Thiene

Philosophers born in the 15th century

 Leon Battista Alberti                 
 Lorenzo Valla 
 Elia del Medigo                       
 Judah Messer Leon
 Cristoforo Landino
 Marsilio Ficino        
 Alessandro Braccesi
 Ludovico Lazzarelli
 Pomponazzi
 Giovanni Pico della Mirandola
 Alessandro Achillini
 Francesco Cattani da Diacceto
 Francesco Zorzi
 Thomas Cajetan
 Niccolò Machiavelli
 Aulo Giano Parrasio
 Petrus Egidius
 Obadiah ben Jacob Sforno
 Marcantonio Zimara
 Agostino Nifo
 Girolamo Fracastoro
 Leandro Alberti
 Giulio Camillo Delminio
 Francesco Guicciardini
 Mariangelo Accorso
 Matteo Tafuri
 Simone Porzio
 Vittore Trincavelli
 Agostino Steuco
 Giovan Battista Gelli
 Mario Nizzoli     
 Sperone Speroni
 Pier Angelo Manzolli

Philosophers born in the 16th century

 Girolamo Cardano
 Moshe Provençal
 Leon of Modena
 Alessandro Piccolomini 
 Bernardino Telesio
 Azariah dei Rossi
 Guglielmo Gratarolo
 Andrea Cesalpino 
 Francesco Piccolomini
 Francesco Patrizi 
 Girolamo Mercuriale 
 Marcello Capra
 Simone Simoni
 Jacopo Zabarella
 Francesco Buonamici 
 Giambattista della Porta
 Francesco Pucci
 Giovanni Botero 
 Guidobaldo del Monte
 Giordano Bruno 
 Jacopo Mazzoni
 Cesare Cremonini
 Giulio Pace
 Abraham Yagel
 Galileo Galilei
 Lodovico delle Colombe 
 Tommaso Campanella 
 Antonio Serra
 Fortunio Liceti 
 Mario Bettinus
 Valeriano Magni 
 Antonio Rocco
 Torquato Accetto 
 Francesco Pona
 Giacomo Accarisi

Philosophers born in the 17th century

 Bartolomeo Mastri 
 Lemme Rossi
 Giovanni Alfonso Borelli
 Tito Livio Burattini
 Francesco D'Andrea
 Elena Cornaro Piscopia
 Michelangelo Fardella
 Giovanni Battista Tolomei
 Domenico Gagliardi
 Francesco Bianchini
 Tommaso Campailla 
 Giambattista Vico
 Luigi Guido Grandi
 Pietro Giannone 
 Giovanni Andrea Tria 
 Antonio Schinella Conti
 Francesco Maria Zanotti
 Alberto Radicati
 Jacopo Stellini 
 Giuseppa Eleonora Barbapiccola

Philosophers born in the 18th century

 Moshe Chaim Luzzatto 
 Giovanni Salvemini
 Francesco Algarotti
 Antonio Genovesi 
 Giovanni Maria Ortes
 Appiano Buonafede
 Cosimo Alessandro Collini 
 Giambattista Toderini 
 Pietro Verri 
 Filippo Mazzei 
 Ferrante de Gemmis
 Cesare Beccaria 
 Giovanni Cristofano Amaduzzi 
 Nicola Spedalieri
 Alessandro Verri
 Melchiorre Delfico
 Niccola Andria
 Vittorio Alfieri 
 Vitangelo Bisceglia
 Gaetano Filangieri 
 Joseph de Maistre
 Gian Domenico Romagnosi
 Marco Mastrofini
 Pasquale Galluppi 
 Paolo Costa
 Monaldo Leopardi
 Francesco Puccinotti
 Antonio Rosmini 
 Giacomo Leopardi 
 Terenzio Mamiani della Rovere

Philosophers born in the 19th century

 Carlo Cattaneo 
 Vincenzo Gioberti 
 Matteo Liberatore 
 Giuseppe Ferrari 
 Gaetano Sanseverino
 Augusto Vera
 Francesco De Sanctis
 Ausonio Franchi
 Augusto Conti
 Giorgio Politeo
 Roberto Ardigò
 Francesco Bonatelli
 Francesco Acri
 Francesco Fiorentino
 Giovanni Bovio
 Antonio Labriola
 Gaetano Mosca
 Vilfredo Pareto
 Giuliano Kremmerz
 Benedetto Croce
 Enrico Ruta
 Eugenio Rignano
 Giuseppe Rensi
 Giovanni Gentile
 Francesco Saverio Merlino
 Sergio Panunzio
 Carlo Michelstaedter
 Arturo Reghini
 Antonio Gramsci
 Julius Evola

Philosophers born in the 20th century

 Nicola Abbagnano
 Lanza del Vasto
 Alexandre Passerin d'Entrèves
 Ernesto Grassi
 Vincenzo Bianchini
 Ludovico Geymonat
 Norberto Bobbio
 Eugenio Garin
 Augusto Del Noce
 Cornelio Fabro
 Bruno Leoni
 Silvio Ceccato
 Tommaso Palamidessi
 Luigi Gui
 Giorgio Colli
 Luigi Pareyson
 Mario Albertini
 Marino Di Teana
 Manlio Sgalambro
 Emanuele Severino 
 Mario Tronti 
 Umberto Eco
 Toni Negri 
 Gianni Vattimo 
 Remo Bodei 
 Domenico Losurdo 
 Mario Perniola 
 Giorgio Agamben 
 Costanzo Preve 
 Massimo Cacciari
 Francesco D'Agostino
 Franco Berardi 
 Roberto Esposito 
 Paolo Virno 
 Franco Volpi
 Giuseppe Zevola 
 Guido del Giudice 
 Nuccio Ordine 
 Bruno Osimo 
 Carlo Lottieri 
 Marcello Landi 
 Luciano Floridi 
 Massimo Pigliucci 
 Alberto Jori
 Federico Ferrari 
 Michela Marzano
 Paola Cavalieri
 Nicla Vassallo
 Aldo Gargani
 Carlo Penco
 Cristina Bicchieri
 Maria Luisa Dalla Chiara
 Achille Varzi
 Gualtiero Piccinini
 Eva Picardi
 Franca D'Agostini
 Pieranna Garavaso
 Giulio Giorello
 Gloria Origgi
 Lorenzo Magnani
 Evandro Agazzi
 Gianni Vattimo
 Maurizio Ferraris
 Diego Bubbio

See also
Italian philosophy
List of philosophers

Italian
Philosophers